Edmund Alexander "Eddy" Hoost (21 October 1934 – 8 December 1982) was a Surinamese politician and lawyer. He was Minister of Justice and Police between 1973 and 1977. After the independence of Suriname, he became the first Minister of Defence and served until 1977. He was one of the victims of the December murders.

Biography 
Hoost studied at the Law School in Suriname with Hugo Pos and Harold Riedewald. In 1970, together with Eddy Bruma and Roy Adama, he founded the trade union Centrale-47 (C-47), after mass strikes in 1969, demanded a new and more progressive type of labor organization. C-47 became largest trade union in Suriname, after the Mother Union, a trade union closely connected with the National Party of Suriname. In 1973, Hoost became Minister of Justice and Police in the first National Party Combination (NPK I) cabinet, headed by Henck Arron, on behalf of the Nationalist Republican Party (PNR).

The primary agenda of the PNR was the preparation of Suriname for independence. Once in government, negotiations started with the Dutch government headed by Prime Minister Joop den Uyl. Hoost was part of Surinamese delegation to negotiate the exit out of the Kingdom of the Netherlands. From 1954 until independence, Suriname was, like the Netherlands and the Netherlands Antilles, officially an equal partner within the Kingdom of the Netherlands, but foreign affairs and defense were kingdom affairs. As the Justice minister, Hoost was responsible for the transition of the Netherlands Armed Forces in Suriname (TRIS) into the Surinamese Armed Forces (SKM). After independence on 25 November 1975, Hoost became the first Minister of Defence. During the electoral campaign for the 1977 elections, the PNR ended co-operation with the NPS.

In 1980, a military coup took place in Suriname under the leadership of Dési Bouterse. In 1981, Hoost, together with other former ministers of the NPK I and II, were arrested on charges of corruption. The detainees were tortured and eventually released without a fair trial. He was finally released in 1982. On 11 March 1982, army officers Surendre Rambocus, Jiwansingh Sheombar and Wilfred Hawker staged a counter-coup. The insurgency failed and Hawker was executed, while Rambocus and others were arrested. Hoost, together with the lawyers John Baboeram and Harold Riedewald, took on the defense of Rambocus at his court-martial. On 3 December the court sentenced Rambocus to 12 years in prison with forced labour.

In the early morning of 8 December 1982, Hoost, Baboeram, Riedewald and 11 others were arrested and imprisoned in Fort Zeelandia, while Rambocus and Sheombar were transferred from the Memre Boekoe barracks, Santo Boma prison to Fort Zeelandia. An undisclosed number of individuals were executed, including Hoost. The only survivor was trade union leader Fred Derby, who was freed. Hoost is buried at the Mariusrust cemetery.

Hoost was married. He was father of three daughters and one son.

Notes

References 
 René de Groot, Drie miljard verwijten: Suriname los van Nederland 1974-1980, 2004,

External links 
 Eddy Hoost (21 oktober 1934 - 8 december 1982) Radio Nederland Wereldomroep, 5 April 2007 
 Suriname (Case No. 1160) (Committee on Freedom of Association Report; 1983)
 Eddie Hoost: 21 oktober 1934 — 8 december 1982 Advocaat, deken van advocaten 
 Eddy Hoost (1934) advocaat 

1934 births
1982 deaths
Assassinated Surinamese politicians
December murders
Government ministers of Suriname
People murdered in Suriname
20th-century Surinamese lawyers
Nationalist Republican Party (Suriname) politicians